The inaugural edition of the Ladies Open Lugano, formerly the Ladies Open Biel/Bienne, an International-level WTA tennis event, was held in April 2017 at the Swiss National Tennis Centre in Biel/Bienne, Switzerland. The new indoor arena was completed in February 2017.

The tournament lasted only one year in Biel/Bienne and was moved to Lugano in 2018. The surface was also changed from indoor hard to outdoor clay.

Past finals

Singles

Doubles

See also 
 Zurich Open – Swiss Indoor WTA tournament held between 1984 and 2008

External links 
Official website

References 

 
Women's tennis in Switzerland
WTA Tour
Hard court tennis tournaments
Tennis tournaments in Switzerland
2017 disestablishments in Switzerland
2017 establishments in Switzerland